Ratuchah is a village, union council, and administrative subdivision of Chakwal District in the Punjab Province of Pakistan. It is part of Choa Saidan Shah Tehsil.

References 

Union councils of Chakwal District